Herbert Jankuhn (8 August 1905 – 30 April 1990) was a German archaeologist of Prussian Lithuanian heritage who specialized in the archaeology of Germanic peoples. He is best known for his excavations at the Viking Age site of Hedeby, and for his instrumental role in the publishing of the second edition of the Reallexikon der Germanischen Altertumskunde.

Jankuhn joined the Nazi Party, SS and SA in the 1930s.

Early life and education
Herbert Jankuhn was born in Angerburg, East Prussia, Germany on 8 August 1905. His paternal grandfather was Lithuanian, and his mother was a Masur. Spending his youth in Mitau and Tilsit, Jankuhn studied Germanistics, history, philology and physical exercise at the universities of Königsberg, Jena and Berlin. Having studied under Max Ebert and Carl Schuchhardt, Jankuhn received in PhD in archaeology at the University of Berlin in 1931. Jankuhn was strongly influenced by Wilhelm Unverzagt and Albert Kiekebusch, both of whom where critical of the settlement archaeology theories of Gustaf Kossinna.

Early career
Jankuhn completed his habilitation at the University of Kiel in 1935. Since 1930, Jankuhn had conducted excavations at the Viking Age settlement of Hedeby. From 1938, with the help of Ahnenerbe, Jankuhn organized the excavations at Hedeby into one of the largest archaeological projects in the world. The results of his excavations at Hedeby were initially published in 1936, and have since been republished in numerous revised editions.

Jankuhn's work at Hedeby greatly impressed Heinrich Himmler, leader of the Schutzstaffel, with whom Jankuhn became friendly. Jankuhn eventually joined both the Nazi Party, the Schutzstaffel, and became Head of the Excavation and Archaeology Department Ahnenerbe in 1940. During World War II, Jankuhn travelled across German-occupied Europe, where he reported to the Sicherheitsdienst on the reliability of scholars in occupied countries.

Jankuhn was made an associate professor at the University of Kiel in 1940. In the summer of 1942, Jankuhn followed 5th SS Panzer Division Wiking into the Crimea to conduct excavations at Mangup, capital of the Crimean Goths. From 1942 to 1943, Jankuhn was Professor at the University of Rostock. He spent the last years of the war as an intelligence officer in 5th SS Panzer Division Wiking, which surrendered to the United States Army in Bavaria in 1945.

Post-war career
Jankuhn was imprisoned from 1945 to 1948. After his release from prison, Jankuhn was forbidden from teaching, but nevertheless continued to teach and research privately. He returned to Kiel in 1949 in to work on restoring museums destroyed during World War II. He subsequently served as a guest lecturer at the universities of Hamburg and Kiel. From the 1950s onward, Jankuhn played an instrumental role in reviving the field of settlement archaeology, and advocated an interdisciplinary approach to the study of prehistory.

Since 1956, Jankuhn served as associate professor, and from 1959 professor of prehistory and protohistory at the University of Göttingen. During this time, Jankuhn founded and led a number of scholarly organizations, and edited several scholarly publications. From 1968, Jankuhn was instrumental in the publishing of the second edition of the Reallexikon der Germanischen Altertumskunde (1969-2008). He advocated broadening the scope of the series to include not only Germanic peoples, but also Celts, Slavs, Sarmatians and other peoples of ancient north-central Europe. Jankuhn retired from the University of Göttingen in 1973.

Selected works
 Gürtelgarnituren der älteren römischen Kaiserzeit im Samland, 1932
 Die Wehranlagen der Wikingerzeit zwischen Schlei und Treene, 1935
 Haithabu – eine germanische Stadt der Frühzeit, 1938
 Gemeinschaftsform und Herrschaftsbildung in frühgermanischer Zeit, 1939
 Die Ausgrabungen in Haithabu (1937–1939), 1943
 Haithabu – Ein Handelsplatz der Wikingerzeit, 1956
 Die Römische Kaiserzeit und die Völkerwanderungszeit, 1966
 Einführung in die Siedlungsarchäologie, 1977

See also
 Otto Höfler
 Hans Reinerth
 Hermann Aubin
 Franz Altheim
 Jost Trier

References

Sources

External links
 Herbert Jankuhn at the website of the Kiel Directory of Scholars

1905 births
1990 deaths
Academic staff of the University of Rostock
German archaeologists
German editors
German people of Lithuanian descent
German people of Slavic descent
Germanic studies scholars
Humboldt University of Berlin alumni
People from Węgorzewo
People from East Prussia
SS officers
University of Jena alumni
University of Kiel alumni
Academic staff of the University of Kiel
University of Königsberg alumni
Academic staff of the University of Göttingen
Waffen-SS personnel
Ahnenerbe members
20th-century archaeologists
Nazi Party members